Yannick Deschamps is a Grand Prix motorcycle racer from France.

Career statistics

By season

Races by year
(key)

References

French motorcycle racers
1983 births
Living people
125cc World Championship riders